The White Outlaw is a 1929 American silent Western film directed by Robert J. Horner and starring Art Acord, Bill Patton and Lew Meehan.

Cast
 Art Acord as Johnny 'The White Outlaw' Douglas
 Vivian Bay as Janice Holbrook 
 Bill Patton as Ted Williams
 Dick Nores as Chet Wagner
 Lew Meehan as Jed Isbell
 Betty Carter as Mary Holbrook
 Al Hoxie as Sheriff Ralston
 Howard Davies as Colonel Holbrook
 Walter Maly as Deputy Bud Mason
 Slim Mathews as Joe Walton
 Bill Conant as 2nd Sheriff 
 Robert McKenzie as Townsman 
 Fred Parker as Bartender 
 James Sheridan as Checkers Player

References

Bibliography
 Langman, Larry. A Guide to Silent Westerns. Greenwood Publishing Group, 1992.

External links
 

1929 films
1929 Western (genre) films
American black-and-white films
Films directed by Robert J. Horner
Silent American Western (genre) films
1920s English-language films
1920s American films